Keep On Moving is the fifth album by the Butterfield Blues Band, released in 1969.  It continues in the same R&B/soul-influenced horn-driven direction as the band's 1968 album In My Own Dream. 

Keep On Moving reached number 102 on the Billboard 200.

Track listing
 "Love March" (Gene Dinwiddie, Phil Wilson) – 2:58
 "No Amount of Loving" (Paul Butterfield) – 3:14
 "Morning Sunrise" (Paul Butterfield, Phil Wilson) – 2:41
 "Losing Hand" (Charles Calhoun) – 3:35
 "Walking By Myself" (James A. Lane) – 4:31
 "Except You" (Jerry Ragovoy) – 3:53
 "Love Disease" (Gene Dinwiddie) – 3:29
 "Where Did My Baby Go" (Jerry Ragovoy) – 4:23
 "All in a Day" (Rod Hicks) – 2:28
 "So Far So Good" (Rod Hicks) – 2:28
 "Buddy's Advice" (Howard Feiten) – 3:21
 "Keep on Moving" (Paul Butterfield) – 5:02

Personnel
The Butterfield Blues Band
 Paul Butterfield – harmonica, vocals, flute on 1
 Fred Beckmeier – bass on 8 and 11
 Gene Dinwiddie – guitar, keyboards, tenor saxophone, flute, vocals on 1, backing vocals
 Howard "Buzz" Feiten – organ, guitar, French horn on 1, vocals on 9 and 11, backing vocals
 Ted Harris – piano
 Rod Hicks – bass, cello, vocals on 11, backing vocals
 Keith Johnson – trumpet
 Trevor Lawrence – baritone saxophone
 Steve Madaio – trumpet
 Jerry Ragovoy – piano on 8
 David Sanborn – alto saxophone
 Phillip Wilson – drums, vocals on 1, backing vocals

Charts
Billboard - (United States)

References 

1969 albums
Paul Butterfield Blues Band albums
Elektra Records albums
Albums produced by Jerry Ragovoy